IBSAMAR are a series of naval exercises between the navies of India, Brazil and South Africa. The name IBSAMAR is an abbreviation of India-Brazil-South Africa Maritime.

See also
 IBSA Dialogue Forum

References

Indian naval exercises
Brazilian Navy
South African Navy
Brazil–India relations
India–South Africa relations